The 1931–32 İstanbul Football League season was the 24th season of the league. İstanbulspor won the league for the first time. Galatasaray SK and Fenerbahçe SK did not join the league due to the disagreement regarding the match revenues. Beşiktaş JK also left the league after seven matches.

Season

References

Istanbul Football League seasons
Turkey
Istanbul